Mahyar Zahmatkesh is an Iranian football midfielder who plays for Malavan in the Iran Pro League.

Club career

Malavan
He started his career with Malavan youth levels when he was 11. He was promoted to the first team by Farhad Pourgholami. Zahmatkesh signed a professional contract in June 2014 which keeps him until summer 2016 at Malavan. He made his debut for Malavan in the 2014–15 Iran Pro League against Saba Qom as a substitute for Maziar Zare.

Club career statistics

References

External links
 Mahyar Zahmatkesh at IranLeague.ir

1993 births
Living people
Iranian footballers
Malavan players
People from Bandar-e Anzali
Association football midfielders
Sportspeople from Gilan province